The Mixed synchronized 10 metre platform competition of the diving events at the 2015 World Aquatics Championships was held on 25 July 2015.

Results
The final was started at 15:00.

References

Mixed synchronised 10 metre platform
World Aquatics Championships